Ray Caesar (born October 26, 1958) is an English digital surreal artist who lives and works in Arcadia, Canada.

Early life 

Ray spent 17 years working in the Art & Photography Department of the Hospital For Sick Children in Toronto, in their art therapy program. Inspired by surrealists such as Frida Kahlo and Salvador Dalí, Caesar's experiences at the Children Hospital deeply influenced his artwork. Caesar said: "Working in a photography department in a Children's hospital is the act of chronicling everything from child abuse, re-constructive surgery, to the heroic children that deal with the hardship and challenges that life has to offer. I spent many years creating medical and research documentation, medical and technical drawings, images of huge equipment surrounding tiny premature infants and visual tools for brain-damaged children".

From 1998 to 2001 he worked as a senior animator in GVFX, Toronto, where he mastered his skills in using 3D modelling software.

Artistic style 

Ray Caesar's work is digitally created using 3D modelling software called Maya, mastered while working in digital animation for television and film industries from 1998-2001. His portraits involve contrasting elements of childlike innocence, grotesque physical deformities, and sexual innuendos. In his creations he merges elements of decorative styles and architectural ages, mixing Art Decò, Victorian style and visual codes from the early 1900s.

According to an interview with ``Empty Lighthouse Caesar begins his process with "automatic drawing which is basically just letting your hand do first what your mind hasn't thought about." His work often contains elements which are invisible in the final render such as "old letters and photographs in lockets [that are tucked] away into drawers that are closed." According to Caesar, "I know they are there... and I love that sometimes I forget they are there." Caesar likens the virtual environment to "a dissociative fugue or very deep daydream... you can get lost in there very easily."

 Professional credits 
In 1999, Caesar received a Primetime Emmy Nomination for Outstanding Special Visual Effects for his work on Total Recall 2070, a Gemini Nomination for Special Effects and a Monitor Award for Special Effects in a series.

 Cultural impact 
Caesar's work has become popular amongst celebrities and fashion icons, such as Madonna, who collects his works and has claimed Ray Caesar is one of her favourite artists.

Riccardo Tisci of Givenchy curated issue #8 of A Magazine, in which he featured artwork by Ray Caesar as a source of creative inspiration.

Ray Caesar is frequently featured in Contemporary Art magazine Hi Fructose.

 Solo exhibitions 
 2015 - "Pretty Little Predators", Gallery House, Toronto, Canada 
 2014 - "The Trouble With Angels", Palazzo Saluzzo Paesana, Turin, Italy 
 2014 - "The Trouble With Angels", Dorothy Circus Gallery, Rome, Italy 
 2013 - "Ray Caesar", Corey Helford Gallery Retrospective Show, Culver City, LA, USA
 2012 - "Ray Caesar", Kochxbos Gallery, Amsterdam The Netherlands
 2011 - "A Gentle Kind Of Cruelty", Jonathan LeVine Gallery, New York, USA 
 2011 - "Solo show", Corey Helford Gallery, LA California, USA
 2010 - "I Sogni Di Cristallo", Mondo Bizzaro Gallery, Rome, Italy 
 2007 - "Ipso Facto", Richard Goodall Gallery, Manchester, England 
 2006 - "Sweet Victory", Jonathan LeVine Gallery, New York, USA 
 2005 - "Secret Doors and Hidden Rooms", Jonathan LeVine Gallery, New York, USA 

 Bibliography 
 Ray Caesar, Art Collection,Volume 1. Mark Murphy Designs, 2008.
 Ray Caesar, Ipso Facto. Richard Goodall Gallery Exclusive, 2007.

 Personal life 

Caesar was born in England and moved to Canada in 1967 with his family. In interviews, Caesar has revealed that he suffers from dissociative identity disorder, potentially due to witnessing traumatic events in his childhood including abuse, surgical reconstruction, and animal research. He often refers to an "alternate" named Harry, who has been present in his life as an alter ego since he was 10. According to an interview with The Globe and Mail'', Harry often appears in Caesar's art  as a girl and is a reflection of his gender variance.

Caesar and his Jane and live in Toronto, Canada.

References

British surrealist artists
OCAD University alumni
Living people
1958 births